Antonio García nom de guerre of Eliécer Erlington Chamorro Acosta (born 10 January 1956 in Mocoa, Putumayo Department), is one of the main commanders of the Ejército de Liberación Nacional (usually abbreviated to ELN), or National Liberation Army. 

The ELN is a revolutionary, Marxist, insurgent guerrilla group that has been operating in several regions of Colombia since 1966. Less known than the FARC, it is estimated to be smaller, having between 3,500 and 5,000 armed personnel. 

It is said that Jacobo Arenas (the "nom de guerre" of Luis Morantes), a founder and ideological leader of the FARC-EP, was seen as a hero by García, who once stated in an interview to a Latin American journalist that he considered Arenas to be a hero, just as he considered Simón Bolívar, José Martí and Che Guevara to be heroes.

On May 26, 2008 Ecuadorean and Colombian media reported the arrest of García in Ecuador. The Ecuadorean military said they "probably" did have him in custody, but needed to do more investigation to be sure. The arrest proved to be a mistake. The arrested guerrilla was identified as Willington Claro Arévalo, alias 'Antonio'.

References 

1956 births
Living people
Anti-revisionists
People from Putumayo Department
Members of the National Liberation Army (Colombia)